Prathama means first in Sanskrit.

Prathama Blood Centre is blood bank situated at Ahmedabad, jointly established in 2000, by Ahmedabad Municipal Corporation and Advanced Transfusion Medicine Research Foundation as non-profit voluntary organization. About 50,000 voluntary blood donors donate blood annually at Prathama which is India's first fully automated blood center.

Prathama on World Thalassemia Day 2016, introduced Nucleic acid testing (NAT) of donated blood to reduce the risk of transfusion transmitted infections (TTIs) in people receiving blood. Transfusion of unsafe blood that has not been screened for window period, cases of viral infections could increase the risk of Transfusion Transmitted Infections (TTIs) and at times be life-threatening. NAT has proven effective in detecting such window period infections. Safe blood plays a life saving role in Thalassemia patients who need blood at regular intervals. Thalassemia prevalence in India is 3-4%, with 10,000 to 12,000 reported thalassemia births taking place every year. It is also estimated that there are 30 million thalassemia carriers in the country. With NAT tested blood, these patients live longer and maintain quality of life.

The blood centre designed to expand in a modular manner to accommodate 150,000 units of blood per annum. Prathama Blood Center is non profit organization registered as Section–25 company and Charitable Trust. 100% Voluntary blood collection. About 125,000 blood & blood components are distributed annually without replacement. It has launched its Thalassemia Eradication Program in January 2009.

On 20 July 2013 Prathama had organized a blood camp in Kadi, a town in the state of Gujarat where a young donor was reportedly died 3 hours after the donation. This resulted a ban on the blood center from conducting outdoor camps for collection of blood by the Gujarat state council for blood transfusion.

References

External links
 Prathama Blood Center, website

Healthcare in Ahmedabad
Blood banks in India
Non-profit organisations based in India
Organizations established in 2000